Douglas School, also known as the Douglas Community Learning Center, is a historic school for African-American students located at Winchester, Virginia.  It is a central auditorium plan school built in 1927, with funds from the John Handley Endowment.  It is a one-story, dark red brick building with a four columned, Classical Revival style entry. Additions to
the building were made in 1940, 1951, and 1962. The school served as the only African-American school in the city until 1966, when it was closed after integration of the Winchester schools.

Built in 1927 as a "separate but equal" school for African American students but converted to a community center in 1966 after desegregation; may have been named for Frederick Douglass, despite the spelling difference.

It was added to the National Register of Historic Places in 2000.

References

African-American history of Virginia
School buildings on the National Register of Historic Places in Virginia
Neoclassical architecture in Virginia
School buildings completed in 1927
Schools in Winchester, Virginia
National Register of Historic Places in Winchester, Virginia
Historically segregated African-American schools in Virginia
1927 establishments in Virginia